Daniel Jay Rudolph (1949–2010) was a mathematician who was considered a leader in ergodic theory and dynamical systems. He studied at Caltech and Stanford and taught postgraduate mathematics at Stanford University, the University of Maryland and Colorado State University, being appointed to the Albert C. Yates Endowed Chair in Mathematics at Colorado State in 2005. He jointly developed a theory of restricted orbit equivalence which unified several other theories. He founded and directed an intense preparation course for graduate math studies and began a Math circle for middle-school children. Early in life he was a modern dancer. He died in 2010 from amyotrophic lateral sclerosis, a degenerative motor neuron disease.

Early life and education 
Rudolph was born to William Franklin Rudolph (1922–2000) and Betty Johnalou Waldner (1921–2004). He was the second of three sons, the others being Gregory and James. The family moved to Fort Collins when Daniel was very young. He attended Fort Collins High School where he was active in the chemistry, physics, computer and flying clubs, and was on the student council. He was a semifinalist in the Westinghouse Science Talent Search.

He graduated from Fort Collins High School in 1968 and matriculated at the California Institute of Technology. He attended Caltech on a Sloan Research Fellowship, and planned to major in theoretical physics. He soon changed his mind and graduated with a bachelor's degree in mathematics in 1972. Before graduating he won Caltech's Bell Prize for Undergraduate Mathematics Research.

Career 
Rudolph moved to Stanford University in 1972 where revolutionary work was being done on ergodic theory. He was awarded a Master of Science in 1973 and completed his PhD under the supervision of Don Ornstein in 1975, with the thesis "Non-Bernoulli Behavior of the Roots of K-automorphisms". His work in ergodic theory focused on measure theory, as opposed to the functional analysis approach that dominated ergodic theory.

His description of ergodic theory:

From August 1975 to August 1976, Rudolph was a postdoctoral fellow at the Hebrew University of Jerusalem, where he devised a solution to a problem in ergodic theory that had resisted solutions by Ornstein and others, entitled "When are two-point extensions of Bernoulli shifts also Bernoulli shifts?". In so doing he devised the method of "nesting" which evolved into a powerful tool. He also began his studies into varieties of orbit equivalence.

He became a fellow of the Miller Institute at U.C. Berkeley from late 1976 to 1978 and was appointed assistant professor at Stanford University from 1978 to 1981. He spent part of 1979 at the University of Maryland where he studied dynamics. At Maryland, he lived at "Ergodic House" with Bruce Kitchens, Brian Marcus and Laif Swanson; they were regularly visited by Doug Lind and Andres del Junco.

In 1981 Rudolph was appointed associate professor at the University of Maryland and was awarded a Sloan Research Fellowship. This is also where he became recognised as a world leader in ergodic theory. He was appointed professor of mathematics in 1985 and was at Maryland until 2004, at which time he was chair of the graduate program and acting chair of the Department of Mathematics.

In collaboration with Janet Kammeyer and others, Rudolph developed a theory of restricted orbit equivalence which unified Ornstein’s Bernoulli theory, Dye’s theorem, Kakutani equivalence, and other relations into a single framework.

Rudolph was also a Visiting Professor at several universities, including the Pierre and Marie Curie University (1988), the Mathematics Institute of the University of Warwick, Nicolaus Copernicus University in Toruń (1989), the University of North Carolina at Chapel Hill (1991), Université d'Aix-Marseille (1993); and Université de François Rabelais in Tours (1993).

He presented several lectures, including one at the 2002 International Congress of Mathematicians in Beijing, entitled "Applications of orbit equivalence to actions of discrete amenable groups".

Rudolph and his family moved to his hometown of Fort Collins in 2005, where he was appointed to the Albert C. Yates Endowed Chair in Mathematics at Colorado State University. There he was diagnosed with Amyotrophic lateral sclerosis, a degenerative motor neuron disease.

He founded and directed the SPIRAL program at Maryland, an intensive six-week preparation for graduate studies in mathematical sciences. It was acknowledged by the American Mathematical Society with an award for "Mathematics Programs That Make a Difference" in 2008.

As the disease progressed, some physical activities became impossible for Rudolph, but he continued to teach and do some departmental work, including supervising PhD students. He began a Math circle for middle school girls with the assistance of a middle school teacher, Martha Cranor. It was later expanded to a summer Math Circles camp for middle school girls and boys.

Rudolph died February 4, 2010, from complications from ALS. The April 2012 volume of the journal Ergodic Theory and Dynamical Systems (Vol 32, Part 2) was dedicated to him. One of his last papers was a joint work with Benjamin Weiss and Matthew Foreman in the journal Annals of Mathematics on the conjugacy equivalence relation of automorphisms.

Selected publications 
Rudolph authored and co-authored more than 70 articles in ergodic theory, including:

 
 
 
 
 

He also authored two books:

Personal life 
Before he got married, Rudolph had taken dance classes at as a Caltech undergraduate and at Maryland modern dancing became a serious hobby for him, after being inspired by dance innovator Alvin Mayes. In 1991, Mayes choreographed a duet "For Bill and Johnalou", dedicated to Rudolph's parents. In 1991 Rudolph married Michelle Hyde and they had three children, Beatrice, Jonah and Layton. "Rudolph was devoted to his children and evenings became a precious time to be spent with the children - no longer with friends or dance."

In November 1981 Rudolph's older brother Gregory, Gregory's wife Kristin and their two children died in a plane crash. The plane had been piloted by Gregory and had crashed while attempting to land at Cedar City Airport.

Rudolph was considered dynamic, inspiring and generally positive. For a while he kept a sign in his Maryland office that read "Eat problems for breakfast". His academic papers were considered difficult to read but in-person he expressed ideas elegantly. His students remembered him as "demanding but very supportive".

References

External links
 Daniel Jay Rudolph at the Mathematics Genealogy Project
 Caltech Mathematics Department prizes and awards (archive)
 Colorado State University memorial page for Daniel J. Rudolph

1949 births
2010 deaths
20th-century American mathematicians
California Institute of Technology alumni
Colorado State University faculty
Neurological disease deaths in Colorado
Deaths from motor neuron disease
Academic staff of the Hebrew University of Jerusalem
People from Fort Collins, Colorado
Stanford University alumni
Stanford University faculty
University of Maryland, College Park faculty
21st-century American mathematicians